The 1994–95 FC Bayern Munich season was the 95th season in the club's history and 30th season since promotion from Regionalliga Süd in 1965.  The first competitive match was the DFB-Supercup on 7 August which Bayern lost to SV Werder Bremen after 120 minutes of play.  The Bundesliga campaign ended with a sixth-place finish.  The club lost the first game of the DFB-Pokal.  This loss caused the third exit after one match since 1990–91.  Bayern made it to the semifinals of the Champions League before being eliminated by Ajax.  Giovanni Trapattoni managed the club for one season before returning in 1996–97.

Results

Friendlies

Fuji-Cup

Stuttgart Tournament

Trofeo Luigi Berlusconi

Bundesliga

League results

1

Notes
 Note 1: Bayern Munich initially won the game 5–2, but since Bayern fielded four amateurs instead of the allowed three, the match was awarded to Eintracht Frankfurt as a 2–0 victory.  The goals and bookings shown reflect the original match, but the score, points, position, and goal difference reflect the loss.

League standings

DFB Pokal

DFB-Supercup

Champions League

Group stage

Knockout stage

Quarterfinals

Semifinals

Team statistics

Players

Squad, appearances and goals

|-
|colspan="14"|Players sold or loaned out after the start of the season:

|}

Minutes played

Bookings

Transfers

In

Out

References

Bayern
FC Bayern Munich seasons